Olena Petrova (formerly Elena Petrova; born 24 September 1972 in Sharkan, Udmurtia) is a former Ukrainian biathlete. Petrova had switched to competing for Ukraine when she was unable to land a spot on the Russian team. She is a Merited Master of Sports of Ukraine and a former member of Dynamo (Ukraine).

She débuted on the World Cup circuit in 1992. Petrova ended her career in January 2008; to become a youth coach in Ukraine. She is a member of the National Olympic Committee of Ukraine.

Career
Olympics
1998 - silver medal on the 15 km
World Championships
1996 - Silver medal in the Team event, bronze medal on the 15 km and on the relay
1997 - Bronze medal in the Team event
1999 - Silver medal on the mass-start
2000 - Bronze medal on the relay
2001 - Bronze medal on the relay
2003 - Silver medal on the sprint, and on the relay
2004 - Bronze medal on the 15 km

References

1972 births
Living people
People from Sharkansky District
Ukrainian female biathletes
Olympic biathletes of Ukraine
Olympic silver medalists for Ukraine
Biathletes at the 1994 Winter Olympics
Biathletes at the 1998 Winter Olympics
Biathletes at the 2002 Winter Olympics
Biathletes at the 2006 Winter Olympics
Ukrainian people of Russian descent
Olympic medalists in biathlon
Biathlon World Championships medalists
Medalists at the 1998 Winter Olympics
Dynamo sports society athletes